Bharat Ram or Lala Bharat Ram (15 October 1914 – 11 July 2007) was an Indian industrialist, born in Delhi, British India.

Biography
Born in Delhi, Ram was the son of Lala Shri Ram, who founded Delhi Cloth & General Mills. Ram completed his preliminary education at Modern School New Delhi. He graduated from St. Stephen's College, Delhi with a degree in Mathematics. After his graduation in 1935, he joined Delhi Cloth & General Mills as an apprentice and rose to the position of chairman and managing director in 1958.

Ram founded Shriram Fibres (SRF Ltd) in 1970 and later, Shri Ram Fertilizers. He served on various government committees and wrote two books: Glimpses of Industrial India and From Istanbul to Vienna. He also became the chairman of Indian Airlines. He received the Padma Bhushan award in 1972.

Ram was a passionate golfer and helped found the Indian Golf Union.

Ram died at a New Delhi hospital on 11 July 2007.

References

External links
[www.ficci.com/press/310/BHARAT.doc BHARAT RAM,  AN ARDENT VOTARY O FREE ENTERPRISE: FICCI PRESIDENT]

Recipients of the Padma Bhushan in trade and industry
People from Delhi
1914 births
2007 deaths
St. Stephen's College, Delhi alumni
Businesspeople from Delhi
Indian businesspeople in textiles
Modern School (New Delhi) alumni